Hellmut Seibt (born 25 June 1929 – 21 July 1992) was an Austrian figure skater. He was the 1952 Olympic silver medalist, 1951 World bronze medalist, a two-time European champion (1951–52), and three-time national champion.

Personal life 
Seibt was born on 25 June 1929 in Vienna. He married figure skater Inge Regner in March 1956. He died on 21 July 1992.

Career 
Seibt began skating at age four, having been advised to take up an outdoor activity after suffering pneumonia. He practiced at the Engelmann club in Hernals, Vienna, under the guidance of Rudolf Kutzer and Karl Schäfer.

Seibt was coached by Inge Lind-Solar after World War II. He won his first national medal, silver, in 1947. In 1948, he was sent to his first European Championships, where he placed seventh, and then competed at the 1948 Winter Olympics, finishing ninth. From 1946 to 1948, Seibt also competed in pair skating with Susi Giebisch. Together, they were three-time national silver medalists and competed at the 1948 Winter Olympics, placing 11th.  

Seibt stepped onto a major international podium for the first time at the 1949 European Championships, winning the bronze medal. In 1950, he became the Austrian national champion and went on to take silver at Europeans. 

Seibt won gold at the 1951 European Championships and bronze at the 1951 World Championships. After successfully defending his European title, he competed at his second Winter Olympics and won the silver medal. After retiring from competition in 1952, he performed for three years with the Wiener Eisrevue (Holiday on Ice). 

Seibt coached in Vienna from 1955 to 1962, in Düsseldorf from 1962 to 1967, and in Milan from 1967 to 1972. His students included Hanna Eigel, Regine Heitzer, Trixi Schuba, Evelyn Rossoukhi-Schneider, Christa Jorda, Sissy Zehetmayer, Günter Anderl, Gerhard Hubmann, Ronald Koppelent, Peter Jonas, Claudia Kristofics-Binder, Helmut Kristofics-Binder, Diana Hinko / Heinz Döpfl, Petra Ruhrmann, Dagmar Lurz, Uschi Kessler, Rita Trapanese. The Hellmut Seibt Memorial is an annual competition named after him.

Results

Singles

Pairs with Giebisch

References

 Skatabase: 1948 Olympics
 Skatabase: 1950s Olympics
 Skatabase: 1950s Europeans
 Skatabase: 1950s Worlds
 Database Olympics

Navigation

1929 births
1992 deaths
Austrian male single skaters
Austrian male pair skaters
Olympic figure skaters of Austria
Olympic silver medalists for Austria
Figure skaters at the 1948 Winter Olympics
Figure skaters at the 1952 Winter Olympics
Olympic medalists in figure skating
World Figure Skating Championships medalists
European Figure Skating Championships medalists
Medalists at the 1952 Winter Olympics
Figure skaters from Vienna